Palampur is a hill station and a municipal corporation situated in the Kangra District in the Indian state of Himachal Pradesh. It is surrounded by pine forests and flanked by the Dhauladhar ranges.  There are numerous streams flowing from the mountains to the plains, from Palampur. The combination of greenery, snowclad mountains and water gives Palampur a distinctive look.

Etymology
The term Palampur is formed after combining three wordspani (water), alam (environment or 'abode of') and pur (settlement). Thus, Palampur means "a settlement where there is plenty of rainfall".

History 

Palampur is located in the Kangra Valley. It is a famous hill station and was once a part of the Jalandhar kingdom. The town came into being when Dr. Jameson, the superintendent of Botanical Gardens, introduced the tea bush from Almora in 1849. The bush thrived in the climatic conditions of Palampur and became the focal point of the European tea estate owners with an exception of the famous Wah Tea Estate which was owned by Nawab Muhammad Hayat Khan and his descendants, until 1947. Since then, the Kangra tea of Palampur has become internationally renowned.

The first prime minister of independent India, Pandit Jawahar Lal Nehru, visited Palampur in 1941. There is a Nehru Chowk in Palampur to commemorate this visit.

Pre-independence
The growth of tea estates from the mid-19th century prompted the administration to build infrastructure in Palampur, such as schools, colleges, and hospital. It also became the center of labourers engaged in tea leaves plucking, packing, and transportation.

The earthquake of 1905 left a trail of destruction. There was a lot of reconstruction done. In 1927, the railway line for the hydro-electric project at Joginder Nagar was laid.  An increase in employment options led to the growth of investment in the area.

Post independence
A military station was established at Holta, a strategic location of the town. Chaudhary Sarwan Kumar Himachal Pradesh Krishi Vishvavidyalaya was established in 1978, followed by the establishment of C.S.I.R - Institute of Himalayan Bioresource Technology in 1983. Many infrastructure and sub-division departments were created for electricity board, housing board, public health services and public works department.

Geography
It is in the northwestern region of Himachal Pradesh in north India and is 213 km from the hill station of Shimla.

Distance from major cities
Distance from Chandigarh: 250 km
Distance from Delhi: 512 km
Distance from Shimla: 213 km
Distance from Pathankot: 112 km
Distance from Mumbai : 1,890 km
Distance from Kasauli : 224 km

Climate
Palampur has a monsoonal-influenced humid subtropical climate (Cwa) with not so hot summers and cool winters. Late summer and early spring see massive amount of monsoonal rain.

Demographics
As per the 2011 Indian Census, Palampur municipality had a total population of 3,543, of which 1,814 were males and 1,729 were females. It has a sex ratio of 953 females to 1000 males. Population within the age group of 0 to 6 years was 254. The total number of literates in Palampur was 3,004, which constituted 84.8% of the population with male literacy of 85.9% and female literacy of 83.6%. The effective literacy rate of 7+ population of Palampur was 91.3%, of which male literacy rate was 93.0% and female literacy rate was 89.6%. The Scheduled Castes and Scheduled Tribes population was 785 and 17 respectively. Palampur had 842 households in 2011.

In 2020, after the creation of Palampur municipal corporation, it acquired the nearby panchayats and satellite areas, and the population was recounted to 40,385 after merging with the census figures taken in 2011.

Government and politics

Civic administration

Politics
Palampur is a state legislative constituency in Himachal Pradesh. Lala Kanhiya Lal Butail, was the first representative of Palampur. Palampur is the hometown of the senior BJP leader and former Chief Minister Shanta Kumar. Congress and the Bhartiya Janata Party are the dominant political parties. BJP leaders from Palampur include Ch. Sarvan Kumar, Praveen Sharma and Shiv Kumar. For Congress, the Butail family has been significant. Kunj Behari Lal Butail served as an MLA for over a decade and was the first Pradesh Congress Committee President. The current MLA is Ashish Butail.

Culture/Cityscape

Tourism

Behind the town stands the high ranges of Dhauladhar mountains (white hill of snow), whose tops remain covered for most of the year. This place is being developed as a large tourist centre. A ropeway and an amusement park are being built. An agricultural university is functioning nearby. An Ayurvedic hospital and one Ayurvedic medical college are in Paprola are about 10  km away. Some tea factories are in operation. Kangra valley is known for its tea gardens. On the outskirts of Palampur, the Neugal stream is a thin stream running over stony ground far below the cliff. There is a trek to Bundla Falls which cascades from a height of 100 meters. A recreational spot, called Saurabh Van Vihar, in Bundla, gets its name from Capt. Saurabh Kalia who hails from Palampur. Several trek routes lead out of Palampur, particularly over the Dhauladhar Mountains towards the districts of Chamba and Kullu, Himachal Pradesh. Some important treks are over the Sanghar pass to Bharmaur via Holi, the Thamsar Pass (4,747 meters above MSL) from Billing to Manali via Bara Bhangal, over the Jalsu pass from Baijnath to Bharmaur, and the forest trek from Mcleodganj to Triund. A four-day trek will lead the traveller to Holi, via Waru La. Twenty-eight kilometres from Palampur is Billing, near Bir an important centre for paragliding. Paraglider pilots often land near Palampur after cross-country flights starting from Billing. Palampur has numerous Buddhist monasteries.

Palampur is a rapidly developing town of Himachal Pradesh with plenty of options for people stay.  The upper areas of Palampur experience heavy snowfall and provide opportunities for tourists to engage in winter sports or enjoy a stroll through the tea gardens. Palampur has emerged as a favorite for movie shoots lately. Directors like Imtiaz Ali and Lawrence D'Souza have shot movies in Palampur. A ropeway has been proposed across the Neugal river which will further attract tourists.

Palampur is at the center of all major tourist attractions, with Dharamshala on one side and Baijnath and Manali on the other. One can easily find good and affordable places to stay in the town. You can find hotels, homestays, villas, and cottages at very competitive prices. There are also a good number of restaurants in the main market serving a variety of cuisines.

Some tourist sites around Palampur include:

Saurabh Van Vihar (4  km from Palampur):  Built in the memory of Late Capt. Saurabh Kalia, martyred in the Kargil War, a park was constructed in the Neugal Khad area near Bandla village. Managed by the Himachal Pradesh Forest Department, the Van Vihar was set up with the purpose of providing information to tourists about nature and the environment. The Vihar sprawls over an area of 35  acres and there is a green park located here. The area is surrounded by the Dhauladhar mountains and offers a scenic view. The park is a great picnic spot too and is away from the city crowd. There is a water pond in the park which contains a variety of fish. A boating facility is also provided here and separate kids' park is also there.

Baijnath Shiva Temple:
Built during the 12th century, Bajinath is known to be one of the oldest temples of Shiva. The temple bespeaks ancient art and culture through its pristine and spellbinding craftsmanship. The temple premises are extremely spotless and the view from the rear end of the temple is magical. The temple lies between the Kangra and Mandi districts of Himachal Pradesh. It is just 16  km from Palampur.

Tashi Jong Buddhist Monastery: Tashi Jong can be reached from Palampur or Baijnath. This is a colourful monastery with a meditation hall. One can find some Tibetan foodstuff there.

Birni Devi Temple: At an altitude of 2240 meters, this is one of the easy treks which you can be completed in a day. The locals have homes on the way and they can guide your way across the forest to reach the Birni top. The car journey ends at Jakhani Mata temple from where the trek to Birni Mata starts.

Shri Chamunda Devi Mandir (20  km from Palampur): This is a very important Hindu shrine with the temple of Goddess Chamunda. Thousands of devotees from all over India visit the temple and offer prayers.

Bir and Billing (35  km from Palampur): This village is famous for its Buddhist monasteries. Hang gliding pilots use it as their landing site. Bir, surrounded by tea gardens and an amphitheatre of low hills, is an ideal landing for paragliders. Bir has Buddhist monasteries that are worth visiting. Fine Tibetan handicrafts are also produced here. Billing, up in the hills and 14  km from Bir with an arena of 200  km for high-altitude and cross-country flying, is one of the best aero sports sites in the country.

Baijnath (16 km from Palampur): The Shiva temple at Baijnath is one of the most remarkable monuments of the Kangra valley. The ancient name of this town was 'Kirgrama'. Baijnath got its name from Shiva Vaidyanatha. The temple consists of an 'Adytum' surrounded by a spire of the usual conical shape with a 'Mandap' covered with a low, pyramid-shaped roof. The 'Adytum' contains the Lingam. There is fine sculpture work associated with Ravana, who worshipped Shiva at this spot and gained immortality. Shivratri of Baijnath is a well-attended fair.

Palampur Tea Gardens: Palampur Tea Gardens are the main cause of the tourist rush here. Tea Gardens here are spread over a vast area and add a special touch to the beauty of the place. Palampur is also regarded as the Tea Capital of Northwestern India and produces the famous "Kangra Tea". These tea plantations were started in 1849 by Dr. Jameson and some British officers. Earlier tea grown here was sold in the international markets such as America, Europe and, Australia. But the 1905 Kangra earthquake affected the tea plantations here badly due to which Assam Tea got a better place in the international market. A tea processing factory is also established here to process the tea leaves.

Neugal Khad (2 km from Palampur): Neugal Khad provides a fine view of the Dhauladhar range. It is roaring in the rainy season and gurgling all year round. Himachal Tourism cafe provides food and a view from its restaurant. It is a picnic spot.

Bundla Stream (2 km from Palampur): Bundla stream with a wide chasm of more than 100 meters, swells up and rises madly in monsoons taking stones and boulders along with it making a loud noise like that of continuous thunder. The walk from Palampur to Bundla should not be missed as you can visit the tea gardens too.

Bundla Tea Estate (2 km from Palampur): This tea estate in Palampur, which covers Bundla, Aima, and Lohna panchayats, falls on the road between Neugal Café and main Palampur town. The lush green tea gardens are at their best in the monsoon. People can be seen plucking tea from April till October. The old Bundla Tea Estate complex, which is over 200 years old can be seen from the road.

Andretta (13 km from Palampur): It is the home of the artist, late Sardar Sobha Singh, and late playwright Norah Richards. Sobha Singh's Art Gallery is also situated in Andretta.

Gopalpur Zoo (14 km from Palampur): This zoological park, officially known as Dhauladhar Nature Park, developed by the H.P government, is a good place for animal lovers and children. The park has a wide range of animals such as lion, leopard, bear, porcupine.

Chamunda Devi Temple (21.2 km from Palampur): Chamunda Devi, also known as Chamundi, Chamundeshwari, and Charchika, is a fearsome aspect of Devi, the Hindu Divine Mother and one of the seven Matrikas (mother goddesses). She is also one of the primary Yoginis, a group of sixty-four or eighty-one Tantric goddesses, who are family and friends of the warrior goddess Durga. The name is a collaboration of Chanda and Munda, two monsters whom Chamunda killed. She is carefully related to Kali, another fierce aspect of Devi. She is sometimes recognized with goddesses Parvati, Chandi, or Durga as properly. The goddess is often represented as haunting cremation reasons or fig trees. The goddess is worshipped by ritual animal sacrifices along with offerings of wine and in ancient times, the human forfeit was offered too. Initially a tribal goddess, Chamunda was assimilated in Hinduism and later entered the Jain pantheon, too. Though in Jainism, the rites of her worship include all-vegetable offerings, and not the meat and liquor offerings.

Jakhni Mata Mandir:
The Jakhni Mata Temple is a Hindu Temple in the town of Palampur, Himachal Pradesh, India. Dedicated to Mata Jakhni, it is located near Birni Devi Temple at Chandpur Village near Palampur. As per local folklore, it is said to have been in existence since ancient period around 450 years old when Mata Jakhni Image was brought by a family of Gaddi Group from Bharmour, where her image is worshiped. This place is also explored by trekkers and tourists.

Festivals
 Sair is a local festival of Kangra district and is celebrated with great zeal by the people in Palampur. This festival is celebrated on first 'tithi' of 'chaitra mass 'चैत्र मास' every year. Palampur is a place of rivers and rain and in the old days when there were no bridges and less roads people used to die in the river floods. So this festival signifies the offset of rainy season and the black month. On this day people worship the Shair deity. They offer new crop, fruits and vegetables to there deity, they cook many local foods and delicacies and invite their friends and relatives. Newly wed brides return to their in-laws' house after a full month's break at their parents' home. Children celebrate this festival in their own style by playing game with walnuts.
 There is greater sobriety, but no less joy, when Lohri or Maghi comes along in mid January. This is the traditionally mid winter day and also commemorates the last sowing of the Rabi crops. Community bonfires, folk songs and dancing, mark the festival. Local folk songs known as 'lukdiyan' are sung by children, door to door. A special type of sacrament is being made from roasted rice, sugar and peanuts called as 'tilcholi'.
 Palampur Holi Fair is held at Capt. Vikram Batra Stadium. On these days many cultural activities are held. Many singers visit Palampur fair on these days, and tableaux representing different gods are made.

Transport

By air 
SpiceJet and Air India operate daily flights from New Delhi to Kangra Airport which is just 40 km from Palampur. Air India has started a direct flight from Chandigarh International Airport to Kangra Airport from October 2019.

By rail 
Palampur is connected by the narrow gauge Kangra Valley Railway, Pathankot to Joginder Nagar. The railway station is named Palampur (Himachal). It is situated 4 km from ISBT.

By road 
Palampur is well connected by road to all major cities and towns in and around the state. Pathankot-Mandi National Highway 154 (India) (Old NH 20) is the major highway that passes through Palampur.  Himachal Road Transport Corporation (HRTC) is the best way to travel plying air-conditioned, deluxe and semi-deluxe buses from major cities like Delhi and Chandigarh.

Education and research 
 CSIR-Institute of Himalayan Bioresource Technology 
 Chaudhary Sarwan Kumar Himachal Pradesh Agricultural University
 Sri Sai University
 Shaheed Capt. Vikram Batra Govt. Degree College
 KLB DAV College for Girls

Notable persons 
 Captain Saurabh Kalia
 Major General Siri Kanth Korla, DSO, MC, PVSM
 Major Som Nath Sharma, PVC
 Major Sudhir Kumar Walia, AC, SM*
 Captain Vikram Batra, PVC
 Shri Brij Behari Lal Butail, Politician
 Shri Shanta Kumar, Politician

References

Cities and towns in Kangra district